Felicia “Fe” Montes (born November 29, 1975) is a Xicana indigenous artist working and living in Los Angeles, who is dedicated to spreading the message of women and indigenous empowerment through arts activism. Montes is a multimedia artist, poet, performer, educator, professor, and emcee. She is the co-founder and coordinating member of two creative woman's collectives, Mujeres de Maiz and In Lak Ech and El MERCADO y Mas. She also assists with organizing transnational art exhibitions including Zapatistas, Peace Dignity Journeys and La Red Xicana Indigena.

Education 
Montes holds a Bachelor of Arts from the University of California, Los Angeles in World Arts & Cultures with a minor in Chicanx studies from the Cesar E. Chavez Department of Chicana/o Studies. She also holds a Master of Arts in Chicanx Studies from California State University, Northridge and a Master of Fine Arts in Public Practice Art from Otis College of Art and Design. In addition, Montes has various certifications related to wellness and teaching.

Public art practice 
Botanica Del Barrio Rolling Remedios Cart

In her project entitled Botanica Del Barrio, Montes aims to educate and facilitate a dialogue about Mexican traditional medicine. The project is both a workshop in that Montes is the teacher educating the viewer on the art, but also a visual installation in that the plants are arranged in a certain way and the cart is painted with “Botanica del Barrio" in large red letters. The rolling nature of the cart bridges the gap between the artist and the audience by creating a space for education outside the home or expensive wellness clinic.

Politricked Public Art Cart

The Politricked Public Art Cart was created by Montes and Joel ‘ragoene’ Garcia and it aims to disperse “know your rights information” through “posters, projections, performance, poetry, and politics”. The Politricked Public Art Cart looks like a corn or elote vendor cart to allow for mobility and travel to various communities. The Politricked Public Art Cart uses a TV monitor and P.A. system to disperse political information through images, performance, and video. Montes hopes that this format of arts activism can be used a template by other artists to educate.

The Bumpin’ Bici

The Bumpin’ Bici is a public performance piece that is raising the consciousness of audiences through performative protest in the streets. The Bumpin’ Bici is made up of a sound system connected to a bike basket. Montes takes on the character “Raramujer” who is an “urban indigenous wom[a]n who shares oral history and urban indigenous worldviews across Los Angeles”. Montes rides the bike through the streets reciting “floetry” and playing indigenous songs. Montes hopes to create a space of public ritual and redefining what protest looks like.

LACMA Olmec Exhibit Indigenous Peoples Day Intervention

On October 12, 2010, a ceremony ritual to honor ancestors and spirits was organized by Montes to commemorate Indigenous People's Day. The main purpose of the ceremony was to put a blessing on the Olmec stones and statues that were in the exhibition at the Los Angeles County Museum of Art. The ceremony took place unannounced and in places throughout the LACMA that were unauthorized for public use. The ceremony consisted of native prayer drumming, Aztec dance, and huge projections of indigenous history, resistance, and music.

Collections
Montes' work is in the permanent collection of the Los Angeles County Museum of Art. Documentation of her performance work is held in the archive of the Woman's Building, Los Angeles.

Publications 
IN MEMORIAM: JENNI RIVERA: La Chicana De La Banda

Montes is not only a multimedia artist, but a Chicana/x voice in journals. In the article entitled “IN MEMORIAM: JENNI RIVERA: La Chicana De La Banda,” Montes discusses Jenni Rivera's singing career and life as an activist. Throughout this article, Montes reveals how Rivera's emphasis on common themes such as love, sadness, and freedom to live made Montes feel less pain. Though this article is about remembering Rivera, Montes sheds light on what motivates her as an artist. When writing this article, Montes emphasizes Rivera's background in that she said “Jenni Rivera was truly a CHICANA Mexican regional music star (even sang it out loud in a song), representing LBC (Long Beach City), homies, single moms, and homegirls from across Cali, the southwest, and the Americas”. Montes’ emphasis on background and commonality when describing Rivera reveals that Montes is an artist that values culture and community.

Lotería Xicana

In this article published in  	Aztlán: A Journal of Chicano Studies, Montes discusses her spoken word piece entitled “Lotería Xicana”. This piece focuses on Montes’ multiple identities coming together to create her. “Lotería Xicana” is an art piece that combines poetry, props, images, and music. Montes’ “hope is that women of color can connect and relate to these pieces and realize that each of us has our own role and way”. This project reveals that Montes is an artist that is personal, aims to unite, and build community.

Full Moon Coyolxauhqui Circle

In Voice from Ancestors: Xicanx and Latinx Spiritual Expressions and Healing Practices, Montes and Martha R. Gonzales write a chapter entitled “Full Moon Coyolxauhqui Circle” to describe one of Montes’ community building projects centered around woman empowerment. Montes created a community of women that come together to sing, to celebrate the stars, listen to one another, and let go of worries. In her chapter, Montes emphasizes the need for women to have a community to transform emotions with. The chapter reveals the values (community, spirituality, and tradition) that motivate Montes as an artist and leader.

References

Further reading 
Ten Fe By Felicia ‘Fe’ Montes
Guerrera Beats: Hip Hop Chicana En Los Ángeles by Diana Carolina Peláz Rodríguez
“Sacrificios” by Felicia Montes published in Fleshing the Spirit: Spirituality and Activism in Chicana, Latina and Indigenous Women’s Lives
“Movement and Spirit: The Artivism of Felicia Montes” by Felicia Montes

External links 
 http://www.FeliciaMontes.wordpress.com
 http://www.MujeresdeMaiz.com
 http://www.BotanicadelBarrio.com
 http://www.ElMercadoyMas.com

Wikipedia Student Program
University of California, Los Angeles alumni
1975 births
California State University, Northridge alumni
21st-century American poets
21st-century American educators
Living people